Jasper Airport  is located  north of Jasper, Alberta, Canada.

It is mainly used for diversions and military use.

See also
Hinton/Entrance Airport
Hinton/Jasper-Hinton Airport

References

External links

Place to Fly on COPA's Places to Fly airport directory

Registered aerodromes in Alberta
Jasper National Park